Simone Edera (born 9 January 1997) is an Italian professional footballer who plays as a winger for  club Pordenone.

Club career
Born in Turin, Edera was scouted by Silvano Benedetti at the age of eight and brought to Torino to play with the Pulcini formation within the youth teams. He was promoted to the Primavera of Moreno Longo (as an underage player) during the 2014–15 season, winning the Campionato Primavera. He scored the decisive penalty in the final against Lazio.

He made his Serie A debut on 20 April 2016 at the Stadio Olimpico against Roma, replacing Alessandro Gazzi in the 95th minute in a 3–2 away defeat.

On 10 August, he was loaned to Venezia, with whom he played six games, before moving to Parma during the January transfer window. With the Ducali he won promotion at the end of the Lega Pro Promotion play-offs. After the loan expired he returned to Turin.

He started the 2017–18 season coming in at the 75 minute for Iago Falque in a 7–1 home win against Trapani in Coppa Italia on 11 August. On 11 December 2017, he scored his first goal in Serie A, in a 3–1 away victory against Lazio at the Stadio Olimpico. Nine days later, on 20 December, he scored his first goal in Coppa Italia, in the same venue, in a 2–1 away victory against Roma. On 25 June, he renewed his contract with Torino until 2023.

On 31 January 2019, Edera joined Bologna on loan until 30 June 2019. On 30 January 2021, he joined Reggina on loan until 30 June 2021.

Throughout the 2021–22 and 2022–23 seasons, Edera appeared on the bench for Torino three times and did not see any time on the pitch.

On 31 January 2023, Edera moved to Pordenone in Serie C and signed a contract until 30 June 2023.

International career

He is a former member of the Italy under-18 and Italy under-19. He made his debut for the Italy under-20 on 5 September 2017 in the Under-20 Four Nations Tournament, won 6–1 against Poland. On 9 November, he scored a brace against the Germany under-20, finished 2–2.

On 22 March 2018, he made his debut with the Italy under-21 in a friendly match against Norway.

Career statistics

Club

Honours
Torino
Campionato Primavera: 2014–15
Supercoppa Primavera: 2015

References

1997 births
Living people
Italian footballers
Footballers from Turin
Association football wingers
Italy under-21 international footballers
Italy youth international footballers
Serie A players
Serie B players
Serie C players
Torino F.C. players
Venezia F.C. players
Parma Calcio 1913 players
Bologna F.C. 1909 players
Reggina 1914 players
Pordenone Calcio players